The Minkus catalogue was a comprehensive  of American and worldwide postage stamps, edited by George A Tlamsa and published by Krause Publications. In the United States Minkus competed with the Scott catalogue as a distant second. Generally sold through department store stamp collecting departments, it had its own system of numbering stamps which was used in its catalogues and stamp albums; Scott's numbering system is proprietary. The Minkus catalogue and numbering system was acquired by Amos Press in 2004 and no further editions were published. The last US catalog was the 2004 Krause-Minkus Standard Catalog of U.S. Stamps.

The Minkus catalogues had more extensive information about the subjects of stamps, a short paragraph about the subject portrayed on the stamp, than the Scott catalogue, which has only a name or brief sentence.

As late as 1974 a two-volume hardbound Minkus New World-Wide Postage Stamp Catalog was published, Volume 1 covering the United States and the British Commonwealth ran to 2004 pages in 1974, Volume 2, covering Europe and the rest of the world was slightly smaller, running to 1292 pages in 1973. A series of specialized paperbound catalogues such as the Krause-Minkus Standard Catalog of Canadian & United Nations Stamps, Krause-Minkus Standard Catalog of Australia Stamps: 2001 : Listings 1948-1999 (Global Stamp Series), and the Krause-Minkus Standard Catalog of Israel Stamps 2001 Edition, Listings 1948-1999 A fully illustrated collector's catalog for the postage stamps of Israel  were published at least until 2001.

Minkus albums included the multi-volume Supreme or Master Global Stamp Album, a comprehensive worldwide album; country albums; and albums for American collectors; supplements were published until at least 2003 and are available on the after-market, e.g. eBay.

See also 
 Jacques Minkus
 List of stamp catalogues

References

External links 
 Is the Minkus Supreme the "Goldilocks" Album for WW Classical Collectors? Friday, April 10, 2015.

Stamp catalogs